James Henry McManus (September 16, 1940 – January 18, 2011) was an American tennis player who reached the semifinals of the US Open men's doubles in 1968. McManus was a founding member of the Association of Tennis Professionals.

Biography
McManus was born to Tom and Margaret McManus on September 16, 1940, and had two brothers - Tom and Bob. McManus was married to his wife Carole for more than 30 years and had two children, Kate and Jordy. He grew up in Northern California and learned the game of tennis at the Berkeley Tennis Club where he was coached by several instructors including Tom Stow, coach of tennis legend Don Budge. Later, McManus played No. 1 singles at the University of California for Coach Chet Murphy. The team finished No. 3 in the NCAA tournament in 1961, his senior year.

McManus was a founding member of the Association of Tennis Professionals (ATP) in 1972 and a member of its original board of directors.

In 2010, he published Tennis History: Professional Tournaments - Winners & Runner-Ups. In 2015, the ATP launched the Jim McManus Memorial Fund in his honor.

Career finals (Open Era)

Doubles (10 titles, 4 runner-ups)

References

External links
 
 

1940 births
2011 deaths
American male tennis players
Tennis people from California
California Golden Bears men's tennis players